A special election was held in  on December 15, 1802 to fill a vacancy caused by the resignation of John Milledge (DR), who had been elected Governor of Georgia. The winner would only finish the term ending March 3, 1803.  A separate election would also be held in October 1803 to fill the seat for the next term.

Election results

See also
List of special elections to the United States House of Representatives

References

Georgia 1802 12 At-large
Georgia 1802 12 At-large
1802 12 At-large
Georgia At-large 12
United States House of Representatives 12
United States House of Representatives 1802 12 at-large